The Historic First Presbyterian Church in Elizabethtown, Kentucky, was a historic church at 212 W. Dixie Avenue.  It was added to the National Register of Historic Places in 1988.

It is a one-story brick church built in 1835 with Federal-style details.  It was significantly modified in 1896, adding Romanesque style elements, including a bell tower.  A two-story brick addition was added in 1943 and 1962.

The church moved to its current location at 1016 Pear Orchard Rd. in Elizabethtown in the early 1990s.

The building at 212 W. Dixie Avenue is currently occupied by the Kentucky High School Basketball Hall of Fame.

References

Presbyterian churches in Kentucky
Churches on the National Register of Historic Places in Kentucky
Churches completed in 1896
19th-century Presbyterian church buildings in the United States
Churches in Hardin County, Kentucky
National Register of Historic Places in Hardin County, Kentucky
1835 establishments in Kentucky
Elizabethtown, Kentucky
Romanesque Revival architecture in Kentucky